MIF  may refer to:

Computing
 Maker Interchange Format, a markup language used by Adobe FrameMaker
 Management Information Format, a format used to describe a hardware or software component
 MapInfo Interchange Format, a map and database exporting file format of MapInfo

Finance
 Master in Finance
 Multilateral Investment Fund, an independent fund administered by the Inter-American Development Bank

Medicine
 Macrophage migration inhibitory factor, a protein involved in immune response.
 Müllerian inhibiting factor, a hormone that plays a role in the sexual differentiation of humans
 Merthiolate-Iodine-Formaldehyde, a solution used in biomedical laboratories

Science and technology
 Magnetized Inertial Fusion, a method of generating energy
 Mass-independent fractionation, any chemical or physical process that acts to separate isotopes
 Maximal intersecting family, in mathematics
 Metal–inorganic framework

Other uses
 Anthony J. Mifsud, Maltese-born Canadian actor, singer and songwriter, performs professionally under the moniker Mif
 Manchester International Festival, an arts festival held in Manchester, England
 Marriage Interference Factor, acceptance of technical equipment by partner
 Miners' International Federation, former global union federation